Nasair, officially known as Nasair Eritrea, was an airline based in Asmara, Eritrea. It operated scheduled flights to domestic destinations in Eritrea, as well as limited scheduled services to the Middle East and Eastern Africa. As of May 2014 the airline was reported to be "out of business."

History
The company was founded in 2006 and is one of three divisions of the Nasair Group. The three subsidiaries of the Group are:

 Nasair Consultant – Provided airline and airport consultancy services.
 Nasair Air Service – The airline. Provided domestic, regional and international scheduled passenger and cargo services.
 Nasair Maintenance Center – Would have provided aircraft maintenance services for own aircraft and those of other airline companies, had regulatory approval been obtained.

Destinations

As of November 2012 Nasair served the following destinations:

Africa

Massawa (Massawa International Airport) Hub

Nairobi (Jomo Kenyatta International Airport)

Khartoum (Khartoum International Airport) 
 
Juba – (Juba International Airport) 

Entebbe (Entebbe International Airport)

Asia

Dubai (Dubai International Airport)

Dammam (King Fahd International Airport)
Jeddah (King Abdulaziz International Airport)

Fleet
The Nasair fleet included the following aircraft (as of November 2012):

References

External links

Defunct airlines of Eritrea
Airlines established in 2006
Organisations based in Asmara
2006 establishments in Africa